Balkrishna Jadeja (born 25 October 1987) is an Indian cricketer. He has played 12 First class, 10 List A and 4 Twenty20 matches.

References

External links
 

1987 births
Living people
Indian cricketers
Saurashtra cricketers